Brion is a commune in the Ain department in eastern France.

The name comes from the Latin word Bria meaning fortress, and it is home to a ruined castle. Brion—Montréal-la-Cluse station has rail connections to Bourg-en-Bresse and Oyonnax.

Population

See also
Communes of the Ain department

References

Communes of Ain
Ain communes articles needing translation from French Wikipedia